Lidiia Yuriyivna Sichenikova (3 February 1993, Chernivtsi) is a Ukrainian archer who competed at the 2012 Summer Olympics in the women's individual and women's team events.

References

External links
 
 

Ukrainian female archers
1993 births
Living people
Olympic archers of Ukraine
Archers at the 2012 Summer Olympics
Archers at the 2016 Summer Olympics
Archers at the 2020 Summer Olympics
Archers at the 2010 Summer Youth Olympics
Archers at the 2015 European Games
European Games medalists in archery
European Games bronze medalists for Ukraine
Archers at the 2019 European Games
Sportspeople from Chernivtsi
20th-century Ukrainian women
21st-century Ukrainian women